Surprise Lake is a lake in Grand Teton National Park, in the U. S. state of Wyoming. The National Park Service has three backcountry campsites at Surprise Lake which are allocated by permit only.

References

Lakes of Grand Teton National Park